House of Women (Swedish: Kvinnohuset) is a 1953 Swedish drama film directed by Hampe Faustman and starring Inga Tidblad, Eva Dahlbeck and Annalisa Ericson. It was shot at the Centrumateljéerna Studios in Stockholm and on location around the city.. The film's sets were designed by the art director Nils Nilsson. It is also known by the alternative title Caged Women.

Cast
 Inga Tidblad as 	Anna
 Eva Dahlbeck as 	Isa
 Annalisa Ericson as Sylvia
 Birgitta Valberg as 	Vera
 Ulla Sjöblom as 	Rosa Karlsson
 Kerstin Palo as 	Eva Lind
 Marrit Ohlsson as 	Ameli
 Georg Løkkeberg as Tryggve Krook 
 Björn Berglund as 	Håkan Håkansson
 Harald Bergström as Photographer 
 Gösta Holmström as 	Policeman 
 Birger Lensander as 	Karlsson 
 Kerstin Moheden as 	Tenant in the Women's House 
 Gösta Petersson as Manager at Krook's Theater 
 Hanny Schedin as Ms. Johansson 
 Jan-Olof Strandberg as 	Rosa's Boyfriend 
 Bengt Sundmark as 	Policeman 
 Ivar Wahlgren as 	Vicar

References

Bibliography 
 Qvist, Per Olov & von Bagh, Peter. Guide to the Cinema of Sweden and Finland. Greenwood Publishing Group, 2000.

External links 
 

1953 films
Swedish drama films
1953 drama films
1950s Swedish-language films
Films directed by Hampe Faustman
Films set in Stockholm
Films based on Swedish novels
1950s Swedish films